National Defense University is a military university established in 2016 and primarily located in Beşiktaş, İstanbul. The university education and training started with the ceremony held on 12 February 2017 at the Air Force Academy. It is a continuation of the Turkish War Academies.

History

In the first half of the 18th year, reforms were made to the Turkish army organization depending on global developments. In 1845 the first military high school and in 1848 War academies were established. Turkish Naval Academy, which was established in 1773 and Turkish Military Academy, established in 1834, were affiliated with the military academies. This was followed by Turkish Air Force Academy, which was established in 1951.

Until 2016, military schools, high schools and academies in Turkey were under the umbrella of the Turkish General Staff. The education and training activities of the schools were carried out under the control of the Education and Doctrine Command (EDOK) in accordance with the Turkish Armed Forces education and training directives. Officers and non-commissioned officers were graduating from schools. 

Military schools were also included in the scope of the reorganization process of the military institutions, which came to the agenda after the July 15 coup attempt. In this process, Heybeliada Naval High School, Işıklar Military High School, Kuleli Military High School, Maltepe Military High School and Gülen movement schools and War Academies, which met the non-commissioned officers and officers needs of the Turkish Armed Forces, which were shown as the agents of the military coup attempt, entered into force on 31 July 2016. It was closed by a decree having the force of law, and all students were dismissed from these schools. With the same decree, the «National Defense University», which will provide education at associate, undergraduate and graduate levels, was established in order to fill the gap in the educational institution that will meet the need for officers and non-commissioned officers that will occur with the closure of these schools.

Administrative structure 
When the university was established, the rector was selected by the president from among three candidates, upon the recommendation of the minister of national defense and the approval of the prime minister. Vice-chancellors were appointed by the minister of national defense, with a maximum of four people. It was predicted that the university organization would be formed later with the decision of the Council of Ministers. However, after the political system change in Turkey in 2018, the appointment of the rector and the organization decision was left to the president.

Rectors

Administrative units

See also 
Turkish War Academies

References

External links 
 

 
Universities and colleges in Istanbul
Educational institutions established in 2016
2016 establishments in Turkey
Military academies of Turkey
Military units and formations established in 2016
State universities and colleges in Turkey